Cabezones is an Argentine hardcore-alternative rock band.

History

Formation
The band, originally from the city of Santa Fe, was formed in 1994. At first, their music was punk, with songs such as "Uniformado de Cagón", but they left that genre behind to start making so-called "hardcore-dark" music.

In 1997 they released Hijos de una nueva tierra, which was published by the independent record label Mentes Abiertas, which they first met in a compilation album along with other alternative rock bands.

Alas and Eclipse (Sol)
In 1998 the band decided to move to Buenos Aires. Their new record, Alas, produced by ex-Soda Stereo member Zeta Bosio, was edited by Sony Music later that year. This meant a change in the sound direction to a heavier and darker music. In 2002, Alas was edited in Mexico, followed by a ten-month tour throughout the country.
Back in Argentina, Cabezones signed a recording contract with Pop Art to edit Eclipse (Sol) in 2003. By the end of that year, Leandro Aput was added as rhythm guitarist.

Intraural and Jardin de Extremidad
In 2004, the band released an EP called Intraural, which was a selection of 6 songs from Eclipse (Sol) played in acoustic versions.
In April 2005 Jardin de Extremidad is released with 12 new songs combining the sound of the two previous records Alas and Eclipse (Sol).
Billed as "Gira de Extremidad", the "Jardin de Extremidad" tour traveled throughout Argentina.
On February 18, 2006 the band recorded its first live CD/DVD titled Bienvenidos, with sold-out tickets at a theater in Buenos Aires.

Accident and disbanding
In March, 2006, a serious car accident left Catupecu Machu bass player, Gabriel Ruiz Diaz, hospitalized for several months. Cesar Andino was the passenger of the car and suffered two broken femurs, one of them an open fracture. After several months of rehabilitation, Cesar Andino was able to perform with Cabezones in the Obras Sanitarias stadium, once again with sold-out tickets. Finally, near Christmas, Cabezones gave which would be the last show with the original members.

In July 2007, Leandro Aput, Esteban Serniotti y Gustavo Martinez left the band. Frontman Cesar Andino, started seeking a solo career, which later ended in the release of the latest Cabezones album.

New members and Solo
On September 29, 2007, Cabezones played in the Pepsi Music Festival with new members Leonardo Licitra and Pablo Negro in guitars, and Matias Tarragona in bass guitar.

In May 2008 they launched their record, Solo. The first single is called “Mi Reina”. The videoclip for this song included various members from other Argentine bands.

The band reunited some time later, and released the CD "Nace".

Band members

Current members
César Augusto Andino: Lead vocals
Romulo Pividori: Drums
Nano Bernardi: Bass guitar
Eugenio Jauchen: Lead guitar

Former members
Esteban "Pichu" Serniotti : Lead guitar and backing vocals
Gustavo Martínez: Bass guitar
Leandro Aput: Rhythm guitar
Leonardo Licitra: Lead guitar
Pablo Negro: Rhythm guitar
Matías Terragona: Bass guitar
Alejandro Collados: Drums

Discography

Albums
Hijos de una nueva tierra (1997)
Alas (2000)
Eclipse (Sol) (2002)
Jardín de Extremidad (2005)
Bienvenidos (2006) - Live Album (Recorded at El Teatro of Colegiales)
Bienvenidos  (2007) - 2006 Live Album + Live Album recorded in Pepsi Music Festival with guests (Ricardo Mollo, Zeta Bosio and Fernando Ruiz Diaz)
Solo (2008) (Originally intended to be Cesar Andino's first solo album)
Nace (2012)
El Naufragio del Alma (2017)

EPs
EP Negro (2001)
Intraural (2004) (Acoustic)

Early releases
These releases are from the band's punk period.

Self Titled Demo (7 songs/Cassette) (1992) 
Un Grito Más (Demo with 4 songs / Cassette) (1995)
Electroshock (1995)

References

Argentine alternative rock groups
Musical groups established in 1994
1994 establishments in Argentina